Henry Aristide "Red" Boucher Jr. (January 27, 1921 – June 19, 2009) was an American politician who served as the second lieutenant governor of Alaska from 1970 to 1974. He had also served as mayor of Fairbanks, Alaska, from 1966 to 1970, and in the Alaska House of Representatives. Boucher served on the Fairbanks City Council and Anchorage Assembly.

Early life and military service
Born in Nashua, New Hampshire, to Henry Aristide Boucher Sr. and Helen Isabel Cameron, Boucher's father died shortly after his birth from lingering effects of exposure to mustard gas in World War I at the Battle of Verdun in 1916. He earned the nickname "Red" after he met President Franklin D. Roosevelt who told him, "They ought to call you Red." in reference to his red hair. After his mother developed multiple sclerosis, he and his brother were placed in St. Vincent's Orphanage in Fall River, Massachusetts.

He served during the Battle of Midway and numerous other battles for a total of twenty years in the Navy, including a stint on the aircraft carrier  as chief petty officer for communications and meteorology.

Career 
After leaving the Navy, Boucher and his family came to Alaska, settling in Fairbanks in 1958 after John F. Kennedy, whom he campaigned for, told him there was great potential in the far north territory. He founded the Fairbanks Goldpanners baseball team in the 1960s, setting up the roots of the Alaska Baseball League. He served on the Fairbanks City Council before becoming mayor in 1966. He was elected lieutenant governor of Alaska under the second administration of Governor William Allen Egan, serving from 1970 to 1974. Afterwards, served in the Alaska House of Representatives and Anchorage Assembly. Boucher ran for Governor of Alaska in 1982, but came fifth in the open primary. He also ran for Mayor of Anchorage in 1987, but lost the election.

He also had an interest in telecommunications, sparked by the first Apple computers, and became known as a telecommunications whiz whose successes included a crusade to boost Internet access in remote Alaska villages.

Personal life 
Boucher suffered a stroke in 2005 and died aged 88 on June 19, 2009, at his home in Anchorage.

References

External links

 
 Red Boucher Alaska Politics Blog, by David Hulen
 Goldpanners web page Photo of Boucher, taken 1962, as he is being interviewed by Bill Walley of KFAR.
 Red A. Boucher at 100 Years of Alaska's Legislature

1921 births
2009 deaths
Anchorage Assembly members
Baseball in Alaska
Businesspeople from Fairbanks, Alaska
Lieutenant Governors of Alaska
Mayors of Fairbanks, Alaska
Democratic Party members of the Alaska House of Representatives
Politicians from Nashua, New Hampshire
20th-century American politicians
20th-century American businesspeople